Wendel Roskopf the Elder (* 5 February 1485 – 1490; † 25 June 1549 in Görlitz) was a stonemason, master builder and member of the cities council 1523 to 1548. In 1526 onwards he was the towns council chief builder.

Work 
After Görlitz burned down in 1525, Roskopf built the Schönhof, the town's first Renaissance building - it was restored in 2006 to house the town's Silesian Museum. From 1537 to 1539 he also headed the construction of the town hall staircase. He also designed the Archivflügel (archives wing) of the town hall. He owned the house whose address is now Bierhof Rosengasse 4.

Bibliography 
 Inga Arnold: Wendel Roskopf der Ältere und die Renaissance in Görlitz, Denkmalpflege in Görlitz, Nr. 8, 1999, S. 4 - 9

References

1480 births
1549 deaths
15th-century German people
15th-century architects
16th-century German architects
People from Görlitz